Juan Povedano Martínez (born 24 May 1979 in Madrid) is a Spanish retired footballer who played as a central defender.

Honours
Rayo Majadahonda
Tercera División: 2000–01

Atlético Madrid B
Segunda División B: 2003–04

Ponferradina
Segunda División B: 2004–05

External links

1979 births
Living people
Footballers from Madrid
Spanish footballers
Association football defenders
Segunda División players
Segunda División B players
Tercera División players
CF Rayo Majadahonda players
Atlético Madrid B players
SD Ponferradina players
UE Lleida players
UD Melilla footballers
CD Leganés players
UD San Sebastián de los Reyes players
Selfoss men's football players
Spanish expatriate footballers
Expatriate footballers in Iceland
Spanish expatriate sportspeople in Iceland